The UC Berkeley College of Chemistry is one of 14 schools and colleges at the University of California, Berkeley. It houses the departments of Chemistry, Chemical and Biomolecular Engineering, and Chemical Biology and occupies six buildings flanking a central plaza.

The College of Chemistry has been listed as the best global university for chemistry in the 2020 U.S. News & World Report Education rankings. The college's Chemical and Biomolecular Engineering program was ranked number two in a tie with Caltech among U.S. News Best Chemical Engineering Graduate Programs in the United States in 2021. Its faculty and graduates have won numerous awards, including the Wolf Prize, the National Medal of Science, the National Medal of Technology, the Presidential Medal of Freedom, as well as eighteen Nobel Prizes. 

The Department of Chemistry is one of the largest and most productive in the world, graduating an average of 80 doctoral students per year. As of July 2020, the College hosts 48 recognized world-class researchers by production of multiple highly cited papers that rank in the top 1% by citations for field and year in Web of Science. Scientists affiliated with the department and the nearby Lawrence Berkeley National Laboratory are responsible for the discovery of sixteen elements, including berkelium, named after the city, and seaborgium, named after Nobel laureate and former department chair Glenn Seaborg.

First established in 1872, the college awarded its first Ph.D. in 1885 to John Maxson Stillman, who later founded the chemistry department at Stanford University. A Division of Chemical Engineering was established in 1946, becoming a department in 1957. The Department of Chemical Engineering changed its name to Chemical and Biomolecular Engineering in 2010 to reflect the research focus of its faculty in the 21st century. The College will turn 150 in 2022.

Students
The College offers three undergraduate degrees: chemical engineering, chemistry, and chemical biology. Chemistry undergrads in the College of Chemistry also have the option to earn a B.A. in chemistry from the College of Letters and Science, or to specialize in a materials chemistry concentration. Two double major programs with the College of Engineering exist: chemical engineering and materials science and engineering, and chemical engineering and nuclear engineering.

Popular undergraduate courses such as Chem 4A (general chemistry) and Chem 12A (organic chemistry) are taught by College of Chemistry faculty.

Graduate programs include the M.S. and Ph.D. in chemical engineering and Ph.D. in chemistry.

Faculty
As of 2020, the faculty at the College includes twelve members of the National Academy of Engineering; 37 members of the National Academy of Sciences; 32 members of the American Academy of Arts and Sciences. Eleven members of the faculty have been awarded the National Medal of Science, and nine have been awarded the Wolf Prize.

Campus
The College of Chemistry is located on the east side of the UC Berkeley campus. It includes Gilman Hall, a National Historic Landmark, where plutonium was first identified in 1941. Pimentel Hall is one of the largest lecture halls on campus, and features a revolving stage to allow for setup of chemistry demos. The buildings of the college are linked by a network of underground hallways and laboratories.

Notable faculty
Paul Alivisatos - Professor Emeritus,  National Medal of Science (2015); Priestley Medal (2020)
Neil Bartlett  - Professor (1969)
Carolyn Bertozzi (Ph.D. 1993)- Professor (1996-2015), Nobel Prize (2022)
Melvin Calvin (B.S. 1931, Ph.D. 1935) - Professor, Nobel laureate (1961)
Robert E. Connick (Ph.D. 1942) - Professor Emeritus of Chemistry, Dean
Jennifer Doudna - Professor, Wolf Award (2020), Nobel laureate (2020)
William F. Giauque (B.S. 1920, Ph.D. 1922) - Professor, Nobel laureate (1949)
John F. Hartwig - Professor, Wolf Award (2019)
Martin Head-Gordon (B.S. 1983, Ph.D. 1989) - Professor (1992), Medal of the International Academy of Quantum Molecular Sciences (1998)
Dudley R. Herschbach - Assistant Professor, Nobel laureate (1986)
Joel Henry Hildebrand (Ph.D. 1906) - Dean (1949–1951), Chairman of the Dept. of Chemistry (1941–1943), Professor
Darleane Hoffman - Professor, National Medal of Science (1997)
Judith Klinman - Professor, National Medal of Science (2012)
Yuan T. Lee (Ph.D. 1965) - Professor, Nobel laureate (1986)
Gilbert Newton Lewis - Dean (1912–1941), Professor
Willard F. Libby (B.S. 1931, Ph.D. 1933) - Professor (1933-1941), Nobel laureate (1960)
Jeffrey R. Long - Professor, National Science Foundation Special Creativity Award
David MacMillan - Professor (1998-2000), Nobel Prize (2021)
George C. Pimentel (Ph.D. 1949) - Professor (1949-1989), National Medal of Science (1985)
Kenneth Pitzer (Ph.D. 1937) - Dean (1951–60), Professor, President of Rice University and Stanford University
John Prausnitz - Professor, National Medal of Science (2003)
Glenn T. Seaborg (Ph.D. 1937) - Professor, Nobel laureate (1951)
Gabor Somorjai Professor, National Medal of Science (2002)
Andrew Streitwieser - Professor, National Academy of Science
Peidong Yang - Professor, MacArthur Genius Award (2015)
Omar Yaghi - Professor, Wolf Award (2018)

Notable alumni
Jan Anderson (Ph.D. 1959 Chemistry) - investigation of photosynthesis
Frances Arnold (Ph.D. 1985 Chemical Engineering) Nobel laureate (2018)
Thomas Cech (Ph.D. 1975 Chemistry) - Nobel laureate (1989)
Robert F. Curl, Jr. (Ph.D. 1957 Chemistry) - Nobel laureate (1996)
Henry Eyring - (Ph.D. 1927 Chemistry) - National Medal of Science (1966)
Andrew Grove (Ph.D. 1963 Chemical Engineering) - cofounder of Intel
Richard A. Houghten (Ph.D. 1975 Chemistry) - Florida Inventors Hall of Fame (2018)
Willis Lamb (B.S. 1934 Chemistry) - Nobel laureate in Physics (1955)
Gordon Moore (B.S. 1950 Chemistry) - cofounder of Intel
Mario Molina (Ph.D. 1972 Chemistry) - Nobel laureate (1995)
Kary Mullis (Ph.D. 1972 Biochemistry) - Nobel laureate (1993)
Geraldine Richmond (Ph.D. 1980 Chemistry) - Priestly Medal (2018)
Susan Solomon (Ph.D. 1981 Atmospheric Chemistry) - Nobel Peace Prize (2007), National Medal of Science (1999)
Henry Taube (Ph.D. 1940 Chemistry) - Nobel laureate (1983)
Harold C. Urey (Ph.D. 1923 Chemistry) - Nobel laureate (1934)
Ahmed Zewail (Postdoc. 1974 Chemistry) - Nobel laureate (1999)

References

External links

Chemistry education
University of California, Berkeley
Educational institutions established in 1872
1872 establishments in California
Science and technology in the San Francisco Bay Area
UC Berkeley College of Chemistry faculty